Rajababu is a 2006 Indian Telugu-language family drama film directed by Muppalaneni Siva. A remake of the 2003 Malayalam film Balettan, the films stars Rajasekhar and Sridevika in her Telugu debut.

Plot 

The film follows Rajababu who learns that he has a second family after his father, Dasaradharamaiah, dies. The problems that ensue after Rajababu meets his second family form the rest of the story.

Cast

Production
Following his previous films, Rajasekar opted for a remake with this film.

Soundtrack 
Music by S. A. Rajkumar, who collaborated with Rajasekar for two other films.

Reception 
A critic from The Hindu opined that "The film is a family drama though the director fails to elevate the hero's image in this film and the entire narration becomes boring.". A critic from Sify stated that "On the whole, it is a boring affair". A critic from Full Hyderabad said that "Avoid this one at all costs". Jeevi of Idlebrain gave the film a more favourable review and wrote that "On a whole, Rajababu is much better than the films Raja Sekhar dished out in the recent past".

Writing for Zamin Ryot, Griddaluru Gopalrao called the film slow-placed, adding the director dragged the screenplay by adding scenes catering to the actor's image.

References

External links 

2006 films
2006 drama films
Indian drama films
2000s Telugu-language films